is a 2002 film directed by Korean-Japanese film director Yōichi Sai. Based on Kazuichi Hanawa's manga, it follows the day-to-day routine of a middle-aged inmate at a low security Japanese prison.

The film uses a series of short vignettes to portray, often with understated humour, different aspects of prison life, especially the unvarying daily routines, the highly detailed rules, and the petty obsessions and minor pleasures that occupy the inmates' thoughts and conversations.

The film is based on the manga of the same name, which relates the author's experiences during a three-year prison sentence.

Plot
Hanawa is a middle aged gun enthusiast, but is jailed for three years for possession of illegal firearms. He is placed in a low security prison in Hokkaidō.

He shares a cell with four other inmates, and adjusts to the strict rules which dictate prisoners' movements in minute detail. At first he is amused by the importance that his cellmates attach to normally trivial matters, but over the course of the film he too comes to find them a way of passing the time and relieving boredom.

After a minor transgression of the rules, he is placed in solitary confinement, where he finds contentment in his solitude and his repetitive job of assembling paper medicine bags.

External links
 

2002 films
2000s prison films
Live-action films based on manga
Films directed by Yōichi Sai
Films set in Japan
2000s Japanese-language films
Japanese prison films
2000s Japanese films